The Takula Tofao (also Tacula Tefao) is a traditional battle helmet from Nias Island, Indonesia.

Description
The Takula Tofao is usually made of steel. The shape is bowl-shaped and consists of steel strips that are joined with rivets or metal wire. It has a narrow helmet rim and two combs arranged according to length and width, which are provided with pointed spikes. Some versions have earmuffs attached. The helmet is often decorated with large ornaments made of iron or horn, which are elaborated in the shape of the tree of life or as fantasy figures. The inner helmet consists of braided rattan cords. The Takula Tofao is used by Nias ethnic group in Indonesia.

Gallery

See also 

 Katapu
 Paseki

References

Indonesian inventions
Medieval helmets
Combat helmets